Septimal may refer to:

Septimal chromatic semitone, the interval 21:20, about 84.47 cents
Septimal comma, a small musical interval in just intonation divisible by 7
Septimal diatonic semitone, the interval 15:14, about 119.44 cents
Septimal diesis, an interval with the ratio of 49:48, about 38.71 cents 
Septimal kleisma, an interval of approximately 7.7 cents
Septimal major third, the musical interval with a 9:7 ratio of frequencies
Septimal meantone temperament, the tempering of 7-limit musical intervals by a meantone temperament tuning
Septimal minor third, the musical interval exactly or approximately equal to a 7/6 ratio of frequencies
Septimal quarter tone, an interval with the ratio of 36:35, about 48.77 cents
Septimal semicomma, an interval with the ratio 126/125, about 13.79 cents
Septimal sixth-tone (or jubilisma), an interval with the ratio of 50:49, about 34.98 cents
Septimal tritone, the interval 7:5, about 582.51 cents
Septimal whole tone, the musical interval exactly or approximately equal to an 8/7 ratio of frequencies
7-limit tuning, musical instrument tunings that have a limit of seven

See also
 Septenary, the base 7 numeral system